Bhool Bhulaiyaa 2 is a 2022 Indian Hindi-language comedy horror film directed by Anees Bazmee, written by Aakash Kaushik and Farhad Samji, and produced by Bhushan Kumar and Krishan Kumar under the banner T-Series Films and Murad Khetani and Anjum Khetani under the banner Cine1 Studios. A standalone sequel to Bhool Bhulaiyaa (2007),  the film stars Tabu, Kartik Aaryan, and Kiara Advani. The plot follows Ruhaan Randhawa, who has to pretend to be a fraud psychic to deal with the return of Manjulika, a malevolent spirit hell-bent on vengeance against the Thakur family. The film is loosely based on the Malayalam film Geethaanjali directed by Priyadarshan, which was based on the Agatha Christie's novel Elephants Can Remember.

Principal photography began in October 2019 and filming was completed in February 2022. Primarily filmed in real mansions in Jaipur and Lucknow, other shooting locations included Mumbai and Manali. The film's score was composed by Sandeep Shirodkar while the songs were composed by Pritam and Tanishk Bagchi, with lyrics written by Amitabh Bhattacharya, Sameer, Yo Yo Honey Singh, Mandy Gill and Saaveri Verma. It features a remix single of the 2007 film's title track by Neeraj Shridhar.

Initially set for release on 31 July 2020, Bhool Bhulaiyaa 2 was delayed owing to the COVID-19 pandemic. It was theatrically released worldwide on 20 May 2022 and received generally positive reviews from critics, with particular praise for Tabu and Aaryan's performances, humour, musical score, cinematography and direction but received criticism for the writing, editing and soundtrack. The film earned  worldwide to become the third highest-grossing Hindi film of 2022.

Plot 

Across a mansion in Bhawanigarh, Rajasthan in 2004, the priests confine a malevolent spirit named Manjulika, who is hell-bent on attacking the family's daughter-in-law Anjulika to a room. After this, the family deserts the mansion for safety.

18 years later, in Himachal Pradesh, Ruhaan Randhawa meets Reet Thakur who is on a trip to Bhawanigarh via Chandigarh to marry her fiancée Sagar reluctantly. They board a bus to Chandigarh but cut short their journey for attending a music carnival and later discover that the bus they were supposed to travel met with an accident, killing everyone on board. Subsequently, the Thakurs, who are owners of the mansion that was deserted 18 years ago, assumed her to be dead. Reet tries contacting her family but over the phone she overhears a conversation between Trisha and Sagar, realizing an affair brewing between them. Seeking to earn them the gift of marriage so she could avoid falling into it, Reet plays along her family's presumption about her demise and travels to Bhawanigarh with a hesitating Ruhaan.

They decide to hide in the deserted ancestral mansion, but Chote Pandit, a priest, spots the doors of the mansion opened and informs the Thakurs, who along with the villagers enter the mansion and spot Ruhaan, who covers up the situation by lying that Reet's spirit led him there and her final wish is to see her family living in the ancestral mansion and that too with Trisha being married. Under Ruhaan's influence, The Thakurs fix Trisha's wedding with Sagar. Due to his presumed ability of communicating with spirits, Ruhaan becomes popular as Rooh Baba, where he and Reet become friends. When Ruhaan is led to the room where the spirit was trapped, Anjulika, Reet's sister-in-law, warns him to stay away from the room and reveals that the spirit is actually Anjulika's twin sister Manjulika. 

The sisters had migrated to the mansion when their father Debanshu was asked to manage accounts for the Thakurs. Debanshu's biased affection towards Anjulika's talents instilled jealousy in Manjulika which turned into hatred. In 2004, both the sisters fell in love with Uday Thakur, Reet's elder brother. However, Uday reciprocated Anjulika's feelings leaving Manjulika fuming and deceived. Manjulika, who sought solace in learning black magic, decided to use the magic as a weapon against Anjulika. On the night of Uday and Anjulika's wedding, Manjulika brutally stabbed Debanshu for finding out the truth and set out to murder Anjulika, but she saved herself and stabbed Manjulika in self-defense killing her. Despite being dead, Manjulika did not leave the family alone as her spirit continued to harm them and paralyzed Uday by pushing him off the balcony. The priests captured Manjulika and lock her in the third floor.

After the flashback, Reet's father reveals to Ruhaan that Manjulika's curse had killed eight members of their family. One night, Chote Pandit finds Ruhaan and Reet roaming around the mansion and discovers the truth. With the help of his elder brother Bade Pandit and his wife whose business is being affected due to Ruhaan's popularity, Chote Pandit spearheads a search in the mansion. Knowing that no one would enter Manjulika's room, Reet resolves to hide there and Chote Pandit's accusations are proved false to the family. Freed, Manjulika attacks Anjulika, who discovers the truth about Reet being alive and joins hands with Ruhaan and Reet to ward off the spirit. They take help from the same priest who captured Manjulika's spirit but he tells them that he requires three days. Manjulika's spirit possesses the priest and makes him kill his disciples before being killed by himself. Ruhaan encounters the spirit and falls off the terrace out of fear.

Ruhaan returns to the palace, conversing in Bengali, and claims himself to be Manjulika revealing that he is possessed. The Thakurs spot Reet and learn that she is alive. Ruhaan attacks Anjulika, who uses Reet as a human shield by threatening to slit her throat if Ruhaan attacks her and addresses him as "Anjulika", which confuses the family. Ruhaan reveals that he has been putting up an act of being possessed by the spirit and that the woman who died in 2004 was actually Anjulika while one who is living with them is the real Manjulika.

In 2004, after killing Debanshu with the help of the priest, revealed to be Manjulika's accomplice, Manjulika influenced Anjulika using black magic and stole her identity. Disguised as Manjulika under the influence of black magic, Anjulika attacked Manjulika who stabbed her to death under the pretext of self-defense. When Uday discovered the truth, Manjulika pushed him off the balcony, paralyzing him and thus preventing him from telling anyone. She also killed eight members of the family for learning the truth. Presently, Anjulika's spirit attacks Manjulika and imprisons her in the same room in which she got locked in 2004. Anjulika's spirit has a moment with her family and asks Reet's father to forgive her since it revealed the truth of Anjulika and Manjulika. She thanks Ruhaan and asks the family to leave as she has unfinished business with Manjulika. Anjulika enters the room and kills the real Manjulika. The whole Thakur family leaves the palace, which becomes abandoned again.

Cast

Production

Development 
A sequel to Bhool Bhulaiyaa (2007) was officially announced on 19 August 2019. Bhushan Kumar, chairman of T-Series, had long considered creating a franchise based on the 2007 film. Aakash Kaushik and Farhad Samji had two separate scripts prepared for their independent films. Samji felt that elements of their two scripts could work together for a new film, and they pitched the idea to producer Murad Khetani. Khetani felt the idea had promise and could work as a sequel to Bhool Bhulaiyaa. Eventually, he approached Kumar, who came on board, collaborating with Khetani for the second time since Kabir Singh, which also starred Kiara Advani.

Filming 
Bhool Bhulaiyaa 2 began filming on 9 October 2019 and wrapped up on 25 February 2022. Aaryan lost his voice while filming the climax sequence of the film. It was filmed in a real mansion. Filming was occurring in Lucknow, before the pandemic disrupted schedule. It was shot in Mumbai and Manali.

Release

Theatrical
Bhool Bhulaiyaa 2 was released on 20 May 2022. The film was originally scheduled to be released in theaters on July 31, 2020, but was delayed due to the COVID-19 pandemic.

Home media
The digital streaming rights of the film are acquired by Netflix. The film was digitally streamed on Netflix from 19 June 2022.
The satellite rights were acquired by Sony Max.

Soundtrack 

The music of the film was composed by Pritam while Tanishk Bagchi appeared as the guest composer for recreating the title track along with Pritam. The lyrics were written by Amitabh Bhattacharya, Sameer, Yo Yo Honey Singh, Mandy Gill and Saaveri Verma.

The song "Bhool Bhulaiyaa 2 - Title Track" was recreated from the title track for the 2007 film Bhool Bhulaiyaa which was sung by Neeraj Shridhar and written by Sameer. This is the second time the song is being recreated after 2017 film Commando 2 which was the titled "Hare Krishna Hare Ram" sung by Armaan Malik, Raftaar, Ritika and composed by Gourov-Roshin.

The song "Ami Je Tomar/Mere Dholna Sun" from the prequel was also retained in the film. Shreya Ghoshal, who sung "Mere Dholna" in the 2007 prequel, reprised her vocals and is featured in three different versions of the song in the film.

The fans of the song "Ami Je Tomar" wanted the voices of Shreya and Arijit for a duet on the song. The song was also released with the title "Ami Je Tomar Kartik X Vidya" on June 28, 2022, take from each video clip of the song.

T-Series also released the "Cine Audio" of Bhool Bhulaiyaa 2 at 24 June 2022.

Reception

Critical response 

Bhool Bhulaiyaa 2 received positive reviews from critics. A critic for Bollywood Hungama gave the film four and a half stars out of five and wrote, "Bhool Bhulaiyaa 2 is a complete entertainer and works due to the splendid combo of horror and comedy." Pallabi Dey Purkayastha of The Times of India rated it three and a half stars out of five and wrote, "Bhool Bhulaiyaa 2 is an agglomeration of grief and the grieving." Rohit Vats of Daily News and Analysis gave it three and a half stars out of five and wrote, "Bhool Bhulaiyaa 2 is an out and out entertainer and next in the line of typical Bollywood 'masala' films." Avinash Lohana of Pinkvilla rated the film three stars out of five and wrote, "Kartik, Kiara and Tabu live up to their parts. The film has a mass appeal and the potential to bring the audience back into the theatres." Tushar Joshi of India Today similarly gave the film three stars out of five and wrote, "Bhool Bhulaiyaa 2 has all the masala and makings to satiate the taste buds. It's funny in places, tries to be scary most of the time, but like its title, its efforts get somewhere lost in a maze." Bharathi Pradhan of Lehren also gave it the same rating and wrote, "Tabu proves once again that she's a rare blend of versatility in performance with an arresting face. It's not the kind of film where you stop to look for logic."

Rohit Bhatnagar of The Free Press Journal rated the film three stars out of five and wrote, "Horror-comedy is a tricky genre, but Anees Bazmee dabbles with funny one-liners and jump scares together quite well." Devesh Sharma of Filmfare, also with three stars out of five, wrote, "Watch the film for Tabu's and Kartik's performances and for its comic elements." Nandini Ramnath of Scroll.in also gave the film three stars out of five and wrote, "Bhool Bhulaiyaa 2 moves along on its hero's insouciance, Tabu's screen presence, and patches of entertaining comedy." In a mixed review, Sukanya Verna of Rediff.com rated the film two and a half stars out of five and found that the film did not take itself seriously to its strength, writing, "Bhool Bhulaiyaa 2 is a silly scary movie that knows it is a silly scary movie." Shalini Langer of The Indian Express rated the film two stars out of five and felt the humour could have been more sensitive: "There are repeated jokes at the expense of an overweight child and a hard-of-hearing pandit." With one and a half stars out of five, Tatsam Mukherjee of Firstpost lamented for the sequel having no narrative relation with the previous film, writing, "While the 2007 film used the vessel of a horror film to tell a rather important story about mental illness, the sequel regresses into actual bhoot-pret (ghost-spirits)."

Box office 
The film showed a jump in collections on third day. There has been a uniform growth of about 35 to 40 percent on the second day, and this is a sign of acceptance from the audience. Bhool Bhulaiyaa 2 earned  at the domestic box office on its opening day. On the second day, the film collected .

Sequel 
A sequel was announced on March 1, 2023. Bhool Bhulaiyaa 3 will release in 2024 coinciding with Diwali.

References

External links 
 
 

Indian sequel films
T-Series (company) films
2020s Hindi-language films
Films directed by Anees Bazmee
Films scored by Tanishk Bagchi
Films set in palaces
Films featuring songs by Pritam
Films shot in Manali, Himachal Pradesh
Films shot in Mumbai
Indian comedy horror films
Films postponed due to the COVID-19 pandemic
2022 comedy horror films